Bestsellers is an American limited comedy web television series created and written by Susan Miller and directed by Tina Cesa Ward. It stars Catherine Curtin, Mandy Bruno Bogue, Alice Barden, Dena Tyler and Natalie Kuhn as five professional women balancing life, work and book club.  The series, presented by SFN Group, debuted on YouTube on January 31, 2011, and aired until March 21, 2011.

Cast and characters 

 Catherine Curtin as Abby, an accountant struggling with whether or not to blow the whistle on her boss who is embezzling money from the company.
 Mandy Bruno Bogue as Nina, a single mommy blogger consumed with current affairs. 
 Alice Barden as Zoe, a smart, neurotic, creative powerhouse and entrepreneur looking for her next big idea.
 Dena Tyler as Jules, an independent contractor who prepares soldiers who return from duty for domestic situations through role playing. She also works with different companies training employees/execs for different scenarios.
 Natalie Kuhn as Taylor, a travel executive whose ambition is to walk across the U.S and recruits the group to go into training with her.

Episodes

References

External links

 
 

American comedy web series
2010s YouTube series
2011 web series endings
2011 web series debuts